Amphicoecia adamana is a species of moth of the  family Tortricidae. It is found in Russia (Siberia, Altai Mountains).

The wingspan is 24–27 mm. Adults have been recorded on wing in June and July.

References

Moths described in 1919
Cnephasiini
Moths of Asia